The Fujica X-mount was a lens mount created by Fujifilm in the late 1970s and early 1980s for the new Fujica SLR lineup: AX-1, AX-3, AX-5, AX Multi, STX-1, STX-1N, STX-2, MPF105X, MPF105XN. It replaced the M42 screw mount used on their earlier SLRs.

The mount is a bayonet type, with a 65° clockwise lock, and a flange focal distance of 43.5 mm.

With the advent of autofocus, the Fujica series of 35 mm SLR cameras was discontinued in 1985, rendering this mount obsolete. Fuji would return to the SLR market in 2000 with a series of digital SLR cameras starting with the FinePix S1 Pro, but these were based on Nikon designs and used the autofocus version of the Nikon F-mount.

Fujifilm introduced a line of twenty X-Fujinon lenses with this mount (as well as some Fujinar lenses):

Fujifilm X-Fujinon lenses
The following lists Fujifilm X-Fujinon lenses with this mount (not including Fujinar lenses with this mount).

Not on that list are the following lenses: EBC X-Fujinon 55mm 1:1.6 DM, X-Fujinon 55mm 1:1.6 DM, EBC X-Fujinon Z 70-140mm 1:4-4.5 DM and the EBC X-Fujinon Z 35-70mm 1:2.8-3.7 DM. The Fujinar lenses are: X-Fujinar W 28mm 1:2.8 DM, X-Fujinar T 135mm 1:2.8 DM, and the X-Fujinar Z 80-200mm 1:3.8 DM.

The "no-DM" lens cannot be used for program and shutter priority exposure modes of the AX-5 SLR; aperture priority and manual mode will work.

Accessories
There were some accessories that complied with Fujica X-mount:
 The "mount adapter X-S and X-D" for M42 lenses.
 Two extension tubes : X25 (25 mm) and X50 (50 mm).
 The "auto bellows X" used with a 50 mm lens can provide 1 to 3× magnification. It can also be used with the "focusing rail X". The Fujica "slide copier X" mounted on the "focusing rail X" simplifies the copying of 135 film pictures.
 The "macro cine copy X" is a macro lens with specific windows to take copies from 8 mm and 16 mm films.
 The "microscope adapter X" to adapt the camera body to a microscope.
 A "reverse adapter X", that can be mounted with an extension tube.
 A classic "teleconverter 2X".
 Fuji Photo Recorder back.  This data back was interchangeable with the standard camera back and was equipped with a hand-writing pen that is inter-linked with a "light pen" for printing in data (up to 80 characters) in the bottom-left corner of the image.  The back can be easily detached by pushing down on the hinge pin.

See also
 Fujifilm X-mount

References

External links
 Billead.com

Lens mounts
Fujifilm SLR cameras